Patrick Joseph "Patsy" Donovan (March 16, 1865 – December 25, 1953) was an Irish born right fielder and manager in Major League Baseball who played for several teams from  to , most notably the Pittsburgh Pirates.

He batted .301 lifetime and set a major league record for career games in right field, as well as retiring among the career leaders in total games (5th, 1813), assists (9th, 264) and double plays (5th, 69) as an outfielder. Donovan batted and threw left-handed.

Early years
Born in Queenstown, County Cork, Donovan established himself as the most successful Irish-born major leaguer.

Minor league career
His second season with the Tecumsehs was less successful due to a leg injury.

Major league career
In 1890 he made his major league debut in the National League (NL) with the Boston Beaneaters, and moved to the Brooklyn Bridegrooms in midseason; it would be the only time in his career that he played for a league champion.

The team was sold late in 1899, during a time when the league was contracting from twelve teams to eight; new owner Barney Dreyfuss brought in Fred Clarke to be manager, with Donovan being sent to the Cardinals. He played for St. Louis from –, sharing the league lead in stolen bases (45) in his first season, also managing the team in his last three seasons with them.

By the end of the 1903 season he ranked among the NL's top ten career leaders in hits and at bats, though he would drop from among the leaders before his playing career ended. His 64 career double plays in the NL ranked one behind Jimmy Ryan's league record. He then served as player-manager for the American League's Washington Senators in 1904, his last season as a regular.

In 1903, he broke Sam Thompson's major league record of 1401 games in right field; Willie Keeler passed him in 1906, before Donovan played his last several games and retired with a total of 1620. In , he became manager of the Brooklyn Superbas, and made his last few playing appearances that year, along with one more game at the end of the  season.

In a 17-season playing career, Donovan had 2256 hits, 1321 runs, 16 home runs and 738 runs batted in in 1824 games, along with 208 doubles and 75 triples. Donovan collected 302 stolen bases from 1890 to 1897, and 216 more after the statistic was revised to its modern definition in 1898.

Post-playing career
As a major league manager, he compiled a 684-879 record (.438) in 11 seasons. He was also instrumental in bringing Babe Ruth to the Sox in  through his acquaintance with one of the Xaverian Brothers who coached Ruth at a Baltimore orphans' home.

In 1929 and 1930, Donovan managed the Orleans town team in the Cape Cod Baseball League. In 1930 one of his charges at Orleans was future New York Yankees legend Red Rolfe.

In a 1930 old-timers' game at Braves Field in Boston, Donovan had a pinch hit single, at the age of 65. He finished out his career coaching High School baseball at Phillips Academy in Andover, where he coached the future 41st President, George H. W. Bush. Donovan died at the age of 88 in Lawrence, Massachusetts, on Christmas Day 1953, and is interred at St. Mary Cemetery in Lawrence.

Honors
In the Irish Baseball League, the annual award for best batter is named "The Patsy Donovan Batting Champion Award".

Managerial record

See also
List of Major League Baseball career hits leaders
List of Major League Baseball career runs scored leaders
List of Major League Baseball career stolen bases leaders
List of Major League Baseball annual stolen base leaders
List of Major League Baseball player-managers
List of players from Ireland in Major League Baseball

References
James Reaney, "Patsy Donovan is remembered for a stellar season with the Tecumsehs" The London Free Press, August 13, 2006
Baseball Star! by Brian Sheehy, Lawrence History News, Spring 2003

External links

The Donovan family Web site 
Patsy Donovan - Baseballbiography.com
Baseball Almanac
obituary The Deadball Era
Baseball Ireland
Brooklyn Baseball Club, 1907 season photo

1865 births
1953 deaths
19th-century baseball players
Baseball managers
Boston Beaneaters players
Boston Red Sox managers
Brooklyn Bridegrooms players
Brooklyn Superbas managers
Brooklyn Superbas players
Buffalo Bisons (minor league) managers
Cape Cod Baseball League coaches
Irish emigrants to the United States (before 1923)
Major League Baseball players from Ireland
Irish baseball players
Louisville Colonels players
Major League Baseball right fielders
Minor league baseball managers
National League stolen base champions
People from Cobh
Sportspeople from Lawrence, Massachusetts
Pittsburgh Pirates managers
Pittsburgh Pirates players
St. Louis Cardinals managers
St. Louis Cardinals players
Washington Senators (1901–1960) managers
Washington Senators (1891–1899) players
Washington Senators (1901–1960) players
Washington Statesmen players
Lawrence (minor league baseball) players
Salem (minor league baseball) players
London Tecumsehs (baseball) players
Major League Baseball player-managers
Sportspeople from County Cork
Attleboro Burros players